Komalnath Adhikari was a Nepalese writer and poet.

Adhikari was born in Duradanda, Lamjung District, Nepal.

In 1963, Adhikari won the Madan Puraskar, Nepal's highest literary honour, for his book Naisadhiya Charit.

See also 

 Satya Mohan Joshi
 Gopal Prasad Rimal

References 

Nepali-language writers
20th-century Nepalese writers
Nepalese male writers
Madan Puraskar winners
People from Lamjung District